The University of Central Florida College of Undergraduate Studies is an academic college of the University of Central Florida located in Orlando, Florida, United States. The dean of the college is Theodorea Regina Berry, Ph.D.

The College of Undergraduate Studies was established in 2015, and was formerly the Office of Undergraduate Studies.

Degrees
The college offers the following degrees: 
Interdisciplinary Studies B.A./B.S.
Integrative General Studies B.G.S.
Environmental Studies B.S.
Applied Science B.A.S. (discontinued)

References

External links
Official website

Undergraduate Studies
Liberal arts colleges at universities in the United States
Educational institutions established in 2015
2015 establishments in Florida